The Copa del Rey de Baloncesto (English: King's Cup of Basketball) is an annual cup competition for Spanish basketball teams organized by Spain's top professional league, the Liga ACB.

History
Originally known as the Copa de España de Baloncesto, was first played in 1933 and contested in its first editions only by teams from the provinces of Madrid and Barcelona. It was the first nationwide basketball competition played in Spain. During the Francoism, it was referred to as the Copa del Generalísimo de Baloncesto, before becoming the Copa del Rey de Baloncesto in 1977.

Format
Until the establishment of the ACB in 1983, the Cup was played in its latest rounds with double-legged series and its final as a single game in a neutral venue. In several seasons, there was a group stage as first round.

From 1983 and 1986, a Final Four format was adopted. The two best qualified teams from the two groups of the Liga ACB at the end of the first stage qualified for the tournament.

Since 1987, the tournament was expanded to a Final Eight format has been used. Since the league is played with a round-robin single group, the top seven teams at the end of the first half of the regular season from the Spanish League and the host one, if it is not between these teams, qualify for the tournament. The eight teams play a knockout tournament at one venue, over four days, eventually producing a winner.

The Copa del Rey is one of the highlights of the Spanish sporting calendar.

Finals

Source: Copa de España ; Linguasport. In Spanish.

Titles by team

Notes

References

External links
Anécdotas en blanco y negro . ACB.com (in Spanish)
Winners by year
Search for historical results and statistics

 
Recurring sporting events established in 1933
1
1933 establishments in Spain
Spain